The Physics arXiv Blog aims to offer an alternative view of  new ideas in science. It is based on, although independent of, the arXiv pre-print repository run by the Cornell University.  Started in 2007,  in 2009 it was hosted by the MIT Technology Review. In 2013, it was moved to the platform Medium. In 2015 it moved back to the MIT Technology Review.

The Physics arXiv Blog  has been said to offer  "the best physics coverage around" by the Wired journal. It was included among the "Five great physics blogs" by The Guardian.

Publication model

Content appears to be crowd sourced from within the physics community. Similar to The Economist, articles seem to lack specific author bylines.

Notes

External links
The Physics arXiv Blog official webpage
The Physics arXiv Blog webpage on Facebook

Science blogs